Graham Johnson is an animator, illustrator and, beginning in 2012, faculty fellow at the California Institute for Quantitative Biosciences.  He has a master's degree in medical illustration from Johns Hopkins, and a PhD in biophysics from Scripps.  After graduating from Johns Hopkins and while working at the Salk Institute, he illustrated the textbook Cell Biology.

Johnson is the creator of the software applications "autoPACK" and "cellPACK" which enable modeling, simulation and visualization of mesoscopic three-dimensional spatial data utilizing packing algorithms.

Notes

References

Further reading
 Peer-reviewed article on the cellPACK software application: 

Living people
Place of birth missing (living people)
Medical illustrators
American illustrators
Johns Hopkins School of Medicine alumni
1973 births
American animators
Scientific animators